Chiloclista is a genus of parasitic flies in the family Tachinidae.

Species
Chiloclista bicolor Townsend, 1931

Distribution
Chile.

References

Diptera of South America
Dexiinae
Tachinidae genera
Monotypic Brachycera genera
Taxa named by Charles Henry Tyler Townsend